Omobranchus zebra, the zebra blenny, is a species of combtooth blenny found in the western Pacific and Indian ocean.  This species can grow to a length of  SL.

References

zebra
Taxa named by Pieter Bleeker
Fish described in 1868